Crevacuore is a comune (municipality) in the Province of Biella in the Italian region Piedmont, located about  northeast of Turin and about  northeast of Biella.

Crevacuore borders the following municipalities: Ailoche, Caprile, Curino, Guardabosone, Pray, Scopello, Serravalle Sesia, Sostegno, Trivero.

Demographic evolution

References

Cities and towns in Piedmont